Yanjing Beer 2019 Chinese FA Cup (Chinese: 燕京啤酒2019中国足球协会杯) was the 21st edition of the Chinese FA Cup. The cup title sponsor was Yanjing Beer. For the first time, entrants were not seeded and there were separate draws for each round.

Schedule
The schedule was as follows.

Qualifying round
Qualifying rounds included two phases: Chinese Football Association Member Association FA Cup and Regional Finals. Teams will compete in the qualifying rounds to secure one of 27 available places in the first round, joining another five amateur clubs (Guangzhou Haoxin, Nanjing Shaye, Ningbo Yinbo, Shanghai Jiading Boji and Hubei Chufeng United) who advanced to the first round directly.

Teams qualified for the Regional Finals

Regional Finals
North China

East China

South China

Northwest China

Southwest China

First round
The draw for the first round was originally scheduled on 18 February 2019. However, it was postponed to 25 February 2019 after the finally list of 2019 China League Two participants was decided. Due to the withdrawal of Shenzhen Xinqiao and Yunnan Flying Tigers as well the promotion of Shaanxi Chang'an Athletic, which directly qualified to the third round, their opponents, Kunshan F.C., Lhasa Urban Construction Investment and Qingdao Elite United received byes and advanced to the second round.

Second round
The draw for the second round took place on 12 March 2019.

Third round
The draw for the third round took place on 3 April 2019.

Fourth round
The draw for the fourth round took place on 21 April 2019.

Fifth round
The draw for the fifth round took place on 2 May 2019.

Quarter-finals
The draw for the quarter-finals took place on 31 May 2019.

Semi-finals
The draw for the semi-finals took place on 24 July 2019.

Finals

1st Leg

2nd Leg

Awards 
 Dark Horse Award
 Shanghai Shenxin
 Taizhou Yuanda
 Shanghai Jiading Boji

Most Valuable Player of The round

Notes

References

2019
2019 in Chinese football
2019 Asian domestic association football cups